The 1971 Major League Baseball postseason was the playoff tournament of Major League Baseball for the 1971 season. The winners of each division advance to the postseason and face each other in a League Championship Series to determine the pennant winners that face each other in the World Series.

In the American League, the Baltimore Orioles were making their third straight postseason appearance, and the Oakland Athletics made their first postseason appearance since the 1931 World Series, when the team was still based out of Philadelphia. This was the first of five consecutive postseason appearances for the Athletics from 1971 to 1975.

In the National League, the Pittsburgh Pirates made their second straight postseason appearance. Joining them were the San Francisco Giants, who made their first postseason appearance since the 1962 World Series. This marked the first time that both teams from the San Francisco Bay Area made the postseason.

The playoffs began on October 2, 1971, and concluded on October 17, 1971, with the Pittsburgh Pirates defeating the Baltimore Orioles in seven games in the 1971 World Series. It was the Pirates' fourth championship in franchise history.

Playoff seeds
The following teams qualified for the postseason:

American League
 Baltimore Orioles – AL East champions, AL best record, MLB best record, 101–57
 Oakland Athletics – AL West champions, 101–60

National League
 Pittsburgh Pirates – NL East champions, NL best record, 97–65
 San Francisco Giants – NL West champions, 90–72

Playoff bracket

American League Championship Series

Baltimore Orioles vs. Oakland Athletics

This was the first postseason meeting between the Orioles and Athletics. This was also the first of ten ALCS series between 1971 and 1981 to feature either the Oakland Athletics or the Kansas City Royals. The only exception was 1979, which featured the Orioles and the California Angels instead. The Orioles swept the Athletics to return to the World Series for the third year in a row (in the process preventing an all-California World Series from occurring). 

In Game 1, the Athletics held a 3-1 lead after six innings, until the Orioles rallied with four unanswered runs in the bottom of the seventh thanks to Curt Motton and Paul Blair, and took Game 1 by a 5-3 score. Mike Cuellar pitched another complete game in Game 2, holding the Athletics to just six hits as the Orioles won by a 5-1 score to go up 2-0 in the series headed to Oakland. The Orioles prevailed by a 5-3 score to clinch the pennant. The Athletics became the first 100+ win team to be eliminated from the postseason in a sweep.

The Orioles and Athletics would meet in the ALCS two more times - in the 1973 ALCS, the Athletics defeated the Orioles in five games to reach their second straight World Series, and in 1974, the Athletics prevailed in four games en route to completing a World Series three-peat.

The Athletics would return to the ALCS the following year, where they defeated the Detroit Tigers in five games en route to the World Series. This was the last pennant won by the Orioles until 1979, where they defeated the California Angels in four games before falling in the World Series.

National League Championship Series

Pittsburgh Pirates vs. San Francisco Giants

This was the first postseason meeting between the Pirates and Giants. The Pirates defeated the Giants in four games to return to the World Series for the first time since 1960 (in the process denying an all-California World Series). 

In San Francisco, the Giants took Game 1 at home, thanks to dual two-run home runs from Tito Fuentes and Willie McCovey in the fifth inning. The Pirates evened the series with a 9-4 victory in Game 2. In Pittsburgh, the Pirates took Game 3 off a solid performance from starting pitcher Bob Johnson, and took Game 4 by a 9-5 score to secure the pennant.

Both teams would meet again in the 2014 Wild Card Game, which the Giants won 8-0.

The Pirates would win their next and most recent NL pennant in 1979, where they swept the Cincinnati Reds. This would be the last postseason appearance for the Giants until 1987.

1971 World Series

Baltimore Orioles (AL) vs. Pittsburgh Pirates (NL) 

†: postponed from October 10 due to rain

This was the first of two World Series during the decade to feature the Pirates and Orioles. The Pirates overcame a two games to none series deficit to defeat the defending World Series champion Orioles in seven games to win their first title since 1960.

The Orioles seemed on track for a sweep at first - Dave McNally pitched a complete game as the Orioles took Game 1 by a 5-3 score, and then Jim Palmer pitched yet another complete game as the Orioles blew out the Pirates in Game 2 to go up 2-0 in the series. However, when the series shifted to Pittsburgh, the Pirates responded. They took Game 3 off a complete game performance from Steve Blass. In Game 4, the first night game in World Series history, the score was tied at three until the bottom of the seventh, when Pittsburgh's Milt May hit an RBI single which scored Bob Robertson, and the Pirates held on to even the series at two games each. Nelson Briles then pitched a two-hit complete game shutout in Game 5 as the Pirates won 4-0 and took a 3-2 series lead. Back in Baltimore, the Orioles rallied to defeat the Pirates in extra innings to force a seventh game. However, the Pirates would take Game 7 by a 2-1 score, as Blass defeated Baltimore's Mike Cuellar in a pitchers duel, securing his second complete game victory of the series. Roberto Clemente was named World Series MVP.

The Pirates returned to the postseason the following year in hopes of defending their title, but they lost to the Cincinnati Reds in five games in the NLCS. The Orioles returned to the postseason in 1973 and 1974, but lost to the Oakland Athletics in the ALCS both times. Both the Pirates and Orioles would meet again in the 1979 World Series, which the Pirates also won in seven games after trailing three games to one.

References

External links
 League Baseball Standings & Expanded Standings - 1971

 
Major League Baseball postseason